The Agricultural and Allied Workers' Union of Nigeria (AAWUN) was a trade union representing workers in the agricultural sector in Nigeria.

The union was established in 1978, when the Nigeria government merged various existing unions:

 Aba Livestock Workers' Union
 Finch and Company (West Africa Limited) Workers' Union
 Ibru Group of Companies Workers' Union of Nigeria
 Ijebu Remo Rubber Plantation Workers' Union
 Ilushin Rubber Estate Workers' Union
 Ilutitun Osoro Oil Palm Estate Workers' Union
 Mid-West Timber Industries Workers' Union
 Mitchell Farms African Workers' Union of Nigeria
 Nigeria Timber Industries Workers' Union
 Nigerian Union of Farm, Plantation, Agricultural and Allied Workers
 Nigerian Union of Sea Fishermen
 Obelawo Farcha Fishing Industry Workers' Union
 Oke-Afa Farms Limited and E. O. Ashamu Group of Companies Workers' Union
 Pest Control Staff Union
 Union of Agricultural Workers of Nigeria
 Western State Agricultural Engineering and Allied Workers' Union
 Western State Association of Professional Agriculturists

The union was a founding affiliate of the Nigeria Labour Congress (NLC), and by 1988, it had 50,000 members.  In 2008, it merged with the Agricultural and Allied Senior Staff Association to form the Agricultural and Allied Employees' Union of Nigeria (AAEUN), but a group of union members disagreed with the merger and continued operating under the AAWUN name.  In 2018, the two unions attempted to merge under the name "Agricultural and Allied Union of Nigeria", but this was not approved by the Registrar of Trade Unions.  In 2019, the AAWUN finally merged into the AAEUN.

References

Agriculture and forestry trade unions
Trade unions established in 1978
Trade unions disestablished in 2019
Trade unions in Nigeria